Heptadecaphobia (Greek:  , "seventeen" and , , "fear") or heptadekaphobia is the fear of the number 17. It is considered to be ill-fated in Italy and other countries of Greek and Latin origins, while the date Friday the 17th is considered especially unfortunate in Italy. The number is feared due to superstition, and is similar in nature to the fear of the number 13 in Anglo-Saxon countries.


History 
In Ancient Greece, the number 17 was despised by followers of Pythagoras, as the number was between 16 and 18, which were perfect representations of 4×4 and 3×6 quadrilaterals, respectively.

In the Old Testament, it is written that the universal flood began on the 17th of the second month (Genesis, 7–11).

It has been suggested that the Romans found the number 17 disturbing because in Roman numerals XVII is an anagram of vixi, meaning "I have lived" (i.e. I am dead).

Friday the 17th 
Indigenous to Italy, Friday the 17th is a date of misfortune, as it is a date of two negatives: Friday (from Good Friday, the day of Jesus' death) and the number 17.

Friday the 17th is similar to other unfortunate dates: for example, in Anglo-Saxon countries, this date is Friday the 13th, while in Spain, Greece, and South America, this date is Tuesday the 13th.

In mass media, the theme is portrayed in movies, such as The Virtuous Bigamist (Italian: "Era di venerdì 17") and Shriek If You Know What I Did Last Friday the 13th (Italian: "Shriek - Hai impegni per venerdì 17? ", where in English, the title refers to the number 13.)

See also 

 List of phobias, including Numerophobia

References 

Phobias
Numerology
17